Events from the year 1872 in France.

Incumbents
President: Adolphe Thiers 
President of the Council of Ministers: Jules Armand Dufaure

Events
27 November - Meteor shower display over France.
Louis Ducos du Hauron creates an early color photograph.
Chargeurs established as a shipping company.
S. T. Dupont begins manufacture of luxury leather goods.

Arts and literature
22 May - Georges Bizet's comic opera Djamileh is premièred at the Opéra-Comique in Paris.
13 November (07:35) (probable date) - Claude Monet begins painting Impression, Sunrise (Impression, soleil levant, the painting that will give a name to Impressionism) as viewed from his hotel room at Le Havre.

Births
16 January - Henri Büsser, composer and conductor (died 1973)
18 January - Prince Emmanuel, Duke of Vendôme, noble from the House of Orléans (died 1931)
24 February - Gustave Sandras, artistic gymnast (died 1951)
26 March - Émile Armand, individualist anarchist (died 1962)
7 June - Rodolphe d'Erlanger, painter and musicologist (died 1932)
1 July - Louis Blériot, inventor, engineer and aviation pioneer (died 1936)
2 July - Gaëtan Gatian de Clérambault, psychiatrist (died 1934)
15 July - Jean Dargassies, racing cyclist (died 1965)
28 July - Albert Sarraut, politician, twice Prime Minister of France (died 1962)
22 September - Octave Denis Victor Guillonnet, painter (died 1967)
17 October – Madeleine Rolland, translator and peace activist (died 1960)
30 November - Maurice de la Taille, priest and writer (died 1933)
12 December - Daniel Halévy, historian (died 1962)

Full date unknown
Léon Bouly, inventor of the cinématographe (died 1932)
François-Victor Équilbecq, author (died 1917)
Colette Reynaud, feminist, socialist and pacifist journalist (died 1965)

Deaths

January to June
6 February - Auguste Joseph Alphonse Gratry, author and theologian (born 1805)
31 March - Jules Guyot, physician and agronomist (born 1807)
5 April - Paul Auguste Ernest Laugier, astronomer (born 1812)
28 April - Louis Désiré Blanquart-Evrard, photographer (born 1802)
20 June - Elie Frédéric Forey, Marshal of France (born 1804)
27 June - Michel Carré, librettist (born 1821)

July to December
5 July - Charles-Pierre Denonvilliers, surgeon (born 1808)
4 October - Jean-Jacques Bourassé, priest, archaeologist and historian (born 1813)
21 October - Jacques Babinet, physicist, mathematician and astronomer (born 1794)
23 October - Théophile Gautier, poet, novelist, journalist, dramatist and literary critic (born 1811)
29 October - Pierre Charles Fournier de Saint-Amant, chess master (born 1800)
6 December - Félix Archimède Pouchet, naturalist (born 1800)
10 December - Étienne Arnal, actor (born 1794)
December - Jean-Baptiste Honoré Raymond Capefigue, historian and biographer (born 1801)

Full date unknown
Ximénès Doudan, journalist (born 1800)

References

1870s in France